Dorcadion taygetanum is a species of beetle in the family Cerambycidae. It was described by Pic in 1902. It is known from Greece.

References

taygetanum
Beetles described in 1902